Seton Hall report, also known as the Denbeaux study, is any of several studies, published by the Center for Policy and Research at Seton Hall University Law School in the United States beginning in 2006, about the detainees and United States government policy related to operations at the Guantánamo Bay detention camp. At a time when the government revealed little about these operations, the reports were based on analysis of data maintained and released by the Department of Defense. The director of the Law School's Center, Mark P. Denbeaux, supervised law student teams in their analysis and writing the studies. The first study was Report on Guantanamo Detainees: A Profile of 517 Detainees through Analysis of Department of Defense Data (February 8, 2006).

By late 2009, Professor Denbeaux had supervised fifteen studies on Guantanamo for the Center for Policy and Research. The studies have been cited in both houses of Congress, for instance, by the Senate Armed Services Committee, and by national and international press.

Denbeaux and his son, Joshua Denbeaux, were listed as the lead names on the first and several succeeding studies. They have a law firm together and are the legal representatives for the Guantanamo detainees Rafiq Bin Bashir Bin Jalud Al Hami and Mohammed Abdul Rahman, both from Tunisia.

Studies

Detainees' profile
The Report on Guantanamo Detainees: A Profile of 517 Detainees through Analysis of Department of Defense Data February 8, 2006, also known as the Denbeaux study (2006), was the first study on Guantanamo prepared under the supervision of Professor Mark Denbeaux of Seton Hall University, the director of its Center for Policy and Research.
Denbeaux and his son Joshua Denbeaux, an attorney for two Guantánamo detainees, oversaw a statistical analysis by law students of the unclassified information available from the Department of Defense about the Guantánamo Bay detainees. The study was published by Seton Hall University's Center for Policy and Research.

The students analyzed:
Where the documents said the detainees were captured.
Who the documents said captured the detainees.
The relationship the documents alleged existed between the detainee and al Qaeda.
The relationship the documents alleged existed between the detainee and the Taliban.

Nat Hentoff of the Village Voice opined:

An editorial by the BBC's John Simpson summarized the study:
92% of the Guantanamo detainees had not been al-Qaeda fighters.
only 5% of the Guantanamo detainees were captured by American forces.
440 of 517 detainees (86%) appeared to have been captured by bounty hunters, in return for a $5,000 reward from the US for each prisoner.

The study reveals that the 92% of the detainees who were not alleged to be al-Qaeda fighters were alleged to be either al-Qaeda or Taliban members, or members of affiliated hostile groups.  Of these "other affiliated groups," a second Center report notes that some of the groups are not included in the government's published lists of terrorist organizations.

The cited primary sources in the study did not include data on actual bounties. One example of a bounty was given in the references: that of Salim Hamdan, who was known to have worked directly for Osama Bin Laden. The reference comes from an article in the New York Times Magazine.

The study says:

Several international news sources noticed this use of the possession of a model of watch as evidence against detainees at Guantanamo Bay with detainees "shocked" that wearing a cheap popular watch sold worldwide could be used against them when "millions and millions of people have these types of Casio watches". Abdulla Kamel al Kandari told his tribunal he had no idea that the watch was associated with terrorism, that the four Muslim chaplains at Guantanamo all wore this model of watch
 and described the features of his watch that signal the call to prayers to a devout Muslim
. Salih Uyar told his tribunal: ''"If it's a crime to carry this watch? Your own military personnel also carry this watch, too. Does that mean that they're just terrorists as well?" 
 Other detainees described how its compass was used to face Mecca, and being waterproof it endured ritual wash up before prayer.

The lead authors are the legal representatives of two Guantánamo Bay detainees: Rafiq Bin Bashir Bin Jalud Al Hami and Mohammed Abdul Rahman

Major Michael Shavers, a Pentagon spokesman, called the 2006 study about the detainees "flawed because its authors didn't have access to classified evidence."

References

External links
 Denbeaux & Denbeaux

Guantanamo Bay captives legal and administrative procedures